Aleksey Kolesnik (born 17 August 1999) is a Belarusian professional footballer who plays for Polotsk.

References

External links 
 
 
 Profile at Naftan Novopolotsk website

1996 births
Living people
Belarusian footballers
Association football forwards
FC Naftan Novopolotsk players
FC Polotsk players